The 2016–17 Gimnàstic de Tarragona's season is the 130th season in the club's existence and the second consecutive in Segunda División.

Players

Squad

Technical staff

Transfers

In

Total spending:  €500,000

Out

Total gaining:  €2,000,000

Balance
Total:  €1,545,000

Contracts

Player statistics

Squad statistics 

 

|-
|colspan="10"|Players on loan to other clubs:

|-
|colspan="10"|Players who have left the club after the start of the season:

|}

Top scorers

Disciplinary record

Competitions

Pre-season/Friendlies

Copa Catalunya

Segunda División

Results summary

Results by round

Matches

Copa del Rey

References

External links
Official website 
Match highlights 
Club news in Diari de Tarragona 

 

2016–17 in Catalan football
Spanish football clubs 2016–17 season
Gimnàstic de Tarragona seasons